The Pink Dress (La robe rose) is an oil-on-canvas painting by Frédéric Bazille, produced in 1864 when he was aged 23. The work is now in the Musée d'Orsay, in Paris.

Dimensions and conservation 
The dimensions of the canvas, kept at the Musée d'Orsay, are a height of 147 cm by a width of 110 cm.

Overview

The painting is an en plein air painting of Bazille's cousin Thérèse des Hours, sitting on the stone ledge around the family property of Le Domaine de Méric in Montpellier, facing the village of Castelnau-le-Lez in the Hérault department of southern France.  The Bazille and des Hours families used to spend every summer on the estates which overlooked the village. Thérèse is sitting on the  terrace at the far end of the garden, facing away from the viewer. She is wearing a dress with vertical pink and silver stripes, with a black apron. Bazille frames the middle ground with trees, a typical technique of the  Barbizon School, using darkness of the trees to direct the viewer's eye to the sun-drenched Midi village in the background.

References 

1864 paintings
Paintings by Frédéric Bazille
Paintings in the collection of the Musée d'Orsay
Landscape paintings